Lonely Are The Brave is the fifth studio album by Jørn Lande's solo project Jorn.

Known as a big Deep Purple fan, Lande recorded a cover of the Deep Purple song "Stormbringer". The cover was released as a bonus track on the European/limited editions. It was also reused for Heavy Rock Radio with some sounds added in.

Track listing

Personnel
Jørn Lande - lead vocals
Jørn Viggo Lofstad - guitar
Tore Moren - guitar
Sid Ringsby - bass
Willy Bendiksen - drums

References

2008 albums
Jørn Lande albums
Frontiers Records albums